Psychotria srilankensis is a species of flowering plant in the family Rubiaceae. It is endemic to Sri Lanka.

References

srilankensis
Endemic flora of Sri Lanka